Wikipedia @ 20 is a book of essays about Wikipedia published by the MIT Press in late 2020, marking 20 years since the creation of Wikipedia. It was edited by academic and author Joseph M. Reagle Jr. and social researcher Jackie Koerner. Contributions came from 34 other Wikipedians, Wikimedians, academics, researchers, journalists, librarians, artists and others, reflecting on particular histories and future themes in Wikipedia discussions.

Background 
The title "Wikipedia @ 20" has a distinct style used in 2021 around celebration of Wikipedia's birthday, and the subtitle paraphrases the closing remarks of the preface:

The book features an introduction by the editors and 21 essays split into three chapters: Hindsight, Connection, and Vision. Essays were selected through an open submission process in the spirit of Wikipedia and published using open publishing platform PubPub.

The project was financially supported by Knowledge Unlatched, the Northeastern University Communication Studies Department, and the Wikimedia Foundation so the book could be released in both print and digital forms.

Synopsis 
The book contains the following essays:

Katherine Maher also contributed to the book.

Reception 
The publication was launched during a live stream with an author's round table on Wikipedia Weekly Network on the 20th birthday of Wikipedia, and it was referenced in international media coverage of the 20th anniversary. The book was endorsed by Wikipedia co-founder Jimmy Wales for its "hard-won wisdom of its contributors, the novel reflections of scholars, and the necessary provocations of those working to shape its next twenty years." It was also reviewed critically by Science magazine's Andrew Robinson and furthermore in Bookforum by Rebecca Panovka who reflected on some of its inconsistencies, ties to "Enlightenment-era liberalism," and lack of voices of less loyal external criticism.

Other mainstream media that referenced the book include The New Yorker, The New Republic and ABC Radio National, as well as technology focused websites. The book is featured in IEEE Xplore, and some of the content of the book was adapted for shorter form publishing, such as a Slate article on how the September 11 attacks shaped Wikipedia.

References

External links 
 Wikipedia@20 on Meta-Wiki
 Wikipedia @ 20 on PubPub
 Wikipedia @ 20 on the MIT Press
 Author's roundtable on Wikipedia Weekly Network on YouTube

History of Wikipedia
MIT Press books
Creative Commons-licensed books
2020 non-fiction books
Essay collections